Gilbert Evelyn was an English politician. He was a Member (MP) of the Parliament of England for Totnes in 1659.

References

Year of birth missing
Year of death missing
Members of the Parliament of England (pre-1707) for Totnes
English MPs 1659